Ghaleb Bencheikh (born 1960 in Jeddah, Saudi Arabia) is a Doctor of Science and physics.

Son of Sheikh Abbas Bencheikh El Hocine and brother of Soheib Bencheikh, Ghaleb Bencheikh is the President of the "Foundation of Islam in France". He hosts the TV show "Islam" which is related to philosophical training and theology.

Ghaleb Bencheikh chairs the World Conference of Religions for Peace, which leads to many interventions in France and abroad. Speaking with ease, Ghaleb Bencheikh spread and popularize his way theses and strong ideas of his brother Soheib Bencheikh.

Ghaleb Bencheikh is a member of the sponsoring committee of the French Coalition for the Decade, spreading culture of peace and non-violence.

See also 

 Soheib Bencheikh
 Sheikh Abbas Bencheikh El Hocine

References

External links 
 Intervention of Ghaleb Bencheikh in the Fez Festival of Sufi Culture in 2007 on the theme "Sufism and human rights"
 Première partie : la science dans les contextes islamiques Conversation between Ghaleb Bencheikh and Faouzia Charfi at France Culture on January 16, 2022.
 Deuxième partie : la science dans les contextes islamiques Conversation between Ghaleb Bencheikh and Faouzia Charfi at France Culture on January 23, 2022.

Bibliography 
 "So, what is Islam?", Ed. Presses de la Renaissance, 2001
 "Islam and Judaism in dialogue" (with Salam Shalom and Philippe Haddad and the collaboration of Jean-Philippe Caudron), ed. the Workshop, 2002
 "Secularism under the Koran", ed. Presses de la Renaissance, 2005
 "Open letter" to the Islamists (with Antoine Sfeir), Bayard, 2008

Islam in France
French Muslims
1960 births
People from Jeddah
Living people
French people of Algerian descent